The 2019–20 Scottish Challenge Cup known as the Tunnock's Caramel Wafer Challenge Cup due to sponsorship reasons, was the 29th season of the competition. The total number of participating clubs is 58. The competition began on 6 August 2019 with the First Round and was due end on 28 March 2020 with the final at McDiarmid Park in Perth. However, the final had to be postponed due to the COVID-19 pandemic and was never subsequently played.

Thirty teams from the Championship, League One and League Two compete, along with four teams from the Highland Football League and four from the Lowland Football League. In addition to this, Under-21 teams of the clubs competing in the Premiership are represented. This season there will be again two clubs from Northern Ireland's NIFL Premiership, two clubs from the Welsh Premier League, two clubs from the Republic of Ireland's League of Ireland and for the second time two entrants from the English National League (fifth tier) entered into the competition.

Ross County were the cup holders after they beat Connah's Quay 3–1 in the 2019 final, but they were ineligible to defend their title following their promotion to the Premiership for the 2019–20 season.

Format

First round
The first round featured 4 clubs from the 2018-19 Scottish Highland Football League (Cove Rangers, Brora Rangers, Fraserburgh, Formartine United), 4 clubs from the 2018-19 Scottish Lowland Football League (East Kilbride, BSC Glasgow, Kelty Hearts, Spartans), 4 clubs from 2018-19 Ladbrokes League Two (Queen's Park, Elgin City, Albion Rovers, Berwick Rangers) and the 12 Under 21 teams of the 2019-20 Scottish Premiership.

The draw was made on 26 June 2019 at 12:30 in the Tunnock's factory in Uddingston and was broadcast live on the SPFL YouTube Channel. The draw was regionalised and all non-Under 21 teams were seeded. The matches were played on 6 and 7 August 2019.

North Section

Draw
Teams in bold advanced to the second round.

Matches

South Section

Draw
Teams in bold advanced to the second round.

Matches

Second round
The draw was also made on 26 June 2019 at 12:30 in the Tunnock's factory in Uddingston and was broadcast live on the SPFL YouTube Channel. The draw was again regionalised but not seeded. Matches were played on 13 August 2019.

North Section

Matches

South Section

Matches

Third round
The 14 winners of the Second Round are joined by the 10 clubs from the Scottish Championship and two teams from the National League, the NIFL Premiership, the Welsh Premier League and the League of Ireland Premier Division.

A pre-draw determined which country was allocated to Pot A, Pot B, Pot C and Pot D to avoid 2 cross-border teams from the same country playing each other. Pot E had the remaining 24 Scottish teams. Games will be played Saturday 7 September or Sunday 8 September 2019.

The draw was made on 14 August 2019 at 12:30 and was broadcast live on the SPFL YouTube Channel.

Teams in bold advanced to the fourth round.

Matches

Fourth round
The draw was made on 10 September 2019 at 12:30, live on the SPFL YouTube Channel.

Teams in Italics were not known at the time of the draw. Teams in Bold advanced to the quarter-finals.

Matches

Quarter-finals
The draw was made on 16 October 2019 at 13:00, live on the SPFL YouTube Channel.

Teams in Italics were not known at the time of the draw. Teams in Bold advanced to the semi-finals.

Matches

Semi-finals
The draw was made on 20 November 2019 at 12:00 and was broadcast live on the SPFL YouTube Channel.

The fixtures were played from 14–16 February 2020.

Matches 

Note: The final was cancelled as a result of the coronavirus situation, both teams were declared joint winners.

Broadcasting rights
The following matches are to be broadcast live on UK television:

Notes 
A. The 2020–21 tournament was cancelled due to the Covid-19 pandemic in Scotland.

References

External links
Scottish Challenge Cup at the Scottish Professional Football League

Scottish Challenge Cup seasons
Challenge Cup
3
Scottish Challenge Cup